The Stockholm International Water Institute, SIWI, is an independent, not-for-profit foundation, which seeks to strengthen the governance of fresh water globally, regionally, nationally, and locally. Founded in 1991, SIWI performs research, builds institutional capacity and provides advisory services in five thematic areas: water governance, transboundary water management, water and climate change, the water-energy-food nexus, and water economics.

Research and competence
The Stockholm International Water Institute initiates research, manages projects and carries out investigations on a wide range of water-related issues. By addressing and implementing strategies and providing policy advice on water resources management and development, the institute also supports decision making processes at both the national and international levels.

Stockholm International Water Institute regularly publishes reports, articles and policy briefs on a wide range of water and development issues. Staff members frequently make presentations, give lectures or facilitate at other water-related education and capacity-building events and programmes. They are frequent guest lecturers at universities such as Stockholm University and KTH.

SIWI's five thematic areas:
 Water Governance
 Transboundary Water Management
 Water and Climate Change
 Water-energy-food nexus
 Water Economics

The UNDP Water Governance Facility (WGF) at SIWI works to improve water governance reform and implementation by providing water governance policy support and advice to government agencies and civil society organizations in developing countries. The Water Governance Facility also participates in global and regional water monitoring and assessment processes and coordinates the chapter on water governance in the UN World Water Development Report.

The Swedish Water House (SWH) is an initiative funded by the Swedish Ministry of Environment and the Swedish Ministry of Foreign Affairs and directed within the SIWI organization. Serving as a network for Swedish stakeholders within different parts of the water sector, SWH aims at focusing Swedish competence in water-related issues and connecting that competence to international processes.

World Water Week in Stockholm

SIWI arranges the World Water Week in Stockholm, an annual week-long conference for professionals from around the globe working in the field of water and development. Each August, World Water Week typically convenes approximately 2500 participants in from government, academia, civil society, the private sector and international and regional organisations.

Prizes and awards
The Stockholm Water Prize, Stockholm Junior Water Prize are administrated by SIWI. Each of these prizes is presented annually during the World Water Week in Stockholm. Together with the Water Supply and Sanitation Collaborative Council (WSSCC) SIWI also sponsors the WASH Media Award – a prize awarded every other year to journalists whose work has led to a raised awareness of the importance of water, sanitation and hygiene services.

External links
 http://www.siwi.org
 http://www.watergovernance.org/
 http://www.swedishwaterhouse.se/
 http://www.worldwaterweek.org/

See also
Centre for Water Economics, Environment and Policy

Research institutes in Sweden
Water and the environment
Water resource policy
Water organizations